Keynen Jae "K.J." 'Wall is an American lawyer from Kansas who is an Associate Justice of the Kansas Supreme Court

Education 

Wall graduated with a Bachelor of Arts in communications from Kansas State University in 1993. At Kansas State, he was an All-American and national-champion debater. Wall received a Master of Arts in rhetoric at the University of Minnesota in 1996. He earned a Juris Doctor from the University of Kansas School of Law, graduating Order of the Coif in 2001.

Legal career 

Wall began his legal career as a law clerk to United States District Judge John W. Lungstrum of the United States District Court for the District of Kansas. From 2013 to 2015 he served as Deputy General Counsel to the Kansas Supreme Court, handling capital cases and special projects. Before working for the Kansas Supreme Court, Wall had been a private practice litigator in Colorado and was Senior Counsel at Federated Insurance in Owatonna, Minnesota. He was a partner with Forbes Law Group in Kansas City, where he regularly represented rural hospitals and other clients in courts throughout the state.

Appointment to Kansas Supreme Court 

On March 11, 2020, Kansas Governor Laura Kelly announced the appointment of Kenyen Wall to the Kansas Supreme Court to fill the vacancy left by the retirement of Lawton Nuss on December 17, 2019. He was sworn into office on August 3, 2020.

References

External links 

Living people
Year of birth missing (living people)
Place of birth missing (living people)
20th-century American lawyers
21st-century American judges
21st-century American lawyers
Colorado lawyers
Kansas lawyers
Kansas State University alumni
Justices of the Kansas Supreme Court
Minnesota lawyers
Missouri lawyers
University of Minnesota College of Liberal Arts alumni
University of Kansas School of Law alumni